The Catlins River flows southeastward through The Catlins, an area of the southern South Island of New Zealand. Its upper estuary is called Catlins Lake, and its lower estuary is shared with the Ōwaka River. The lower estuary is also known at Pounawea Estuary.

See also
Owaka

References

Rivers of Otago
The Catlins
Rivers of New Zealand
Clutha District